Altha lacteola is a moth of the family Limacodidae first described by Charles Swinhoe in 1890. It is found in south-east Asia, including Vietnam and Taiwan.

The wingspan is 25–30 mm. Adults are on wing in September.

Subspecies
Altha lacteola lacteola
Altha lacteola melanopsis Strand, 1915 (Taiwan)

References

Moths described in 1890
Limacodidae